Myxillidae is a family of marine demosponges.

Genera
Damiriopsis Burton, 1928
Ectyonopsis Carter, 1883
Hymenancora Lundbeck, 1910
Melonanchora Carter, 1874
Myxilla Schmidt, 1862
Plocamiancora Topsent, 1927
Psammochela Dendy, 1916
Stelodoryx Topsent, 1904

References

Poecilosclerida